Colombia first participated at the Youth Olympic Games at the inaugural 2010 Games in Singapore. Colombia has sent a team to each Summer Youth Olympic Games and participated for the first time at the Winter Youth Olympic Games in the 2016 edition in  Lillehammer. Colombian city of Medellín submitted a bid to host the 2018 Summer Youth Olympics, but in a voting process in 2013 lost the games to the Argentine capital, Buenos Aires.

Medal tables

Competing at the Youth Olympic Games, Colombian athletes has won a total of 18 medals, in 9 different sports. Weightlifter José Gavino Mena won the country's first medal at this competition, at the inaugural edition held in Singapore in 2010. As in the senior Olympics, weightlifting is the most successful sport for the country with five medals won, although none of them is a gold; and cycling is also a successful sport, contributing with two gold and one bronze medals. Roller speed skating is a very popular sport in Colombia, hence the domination by the country in that sport at international competitions. The sport was introduced in the Olympic program for the Buenos Aires Games in 2018, and Colombian skaters won the two events held at those games. The medals won in tennis and equestrian in 2010 were the first won for the country at Olympic competitions. Indeed, in tennis the Colombians has won a complete set of medals as of 2018. Taekwondo practitioner Debbie Yopasa Gómez was the first female medalist for Colombia at the Youth Olympics, winning a bronze medal in Nanjing 2014. Despite being a tropical country, Colombia made its debut at the Winter Youth Olympics in Lillehammer 2016. Michael Poettoz was the sole representative of the country at those games (He later went on to become the first person to be born in Colombia to qualify to compete at the senior Winter Olympics in PyeongChang 2018). Tennis player María Osorio is the only Colombian athlete to have won two medals for the country at the youth games, and the only one (including senior Olympic Games) to have won two medals at a single edition of the Olympics. Diver Daniel Restrepo won Colombia's first medal in diving at Olympic competitions.

Medals by Summer Youth Games

Medals by Winter Youth Games

Medals by summer sport

Medalists by Summer Games

Medalists by Winter Games

See also 
 Colombia at the Olympics
 Colombia at the Paralympics
 Colombia at the Pan American Games

References